"Shame on the Moon" is a song written by Rodney Crowell and first recorded for his eponymous 1981 album. It was subsequently covered by Bob Seger & The Silver Bullet Band, as the lead single from their 1982 album The Distance.  

Glenn Frey joins Seger on background harmony vocals on the song. The song spent four weeks at number two on the Billboard Hot 100 pop singles chart (blocked from the top spot by Patti Austin and James Ingram's "Baby, Come to Me" and by Michael Jackson's smash hit "Billie Jean") and topped the adult contemporary chart. The song also went to number 15 on the country chart in early 1983, marking Seger's only Top 40 entry on that chart.

Critical reception
Billboard magazine reviewed the song favorably, saying that "his trademark acoustic guitar sets the tone, followed by an easygoing vocal and loping rhythm."  Cash Box said that "fans of Bob Seger’s ballad side...will unquestionably take delight in this mostly-acoustic country/pop Rodney Crowell tune" since Seger "makes it his own."

Classic Rock History critic Janey Roberts rated it as Seger's 15th best song.

Bob Seger's Comments
Speaking with Creem in 1983, Seger said: "It's more like a western song - a cowboy song - than it is a country & western song. And the track is flawless, the best and tightest track on the album. We cut it in like two hours, and everyone decided it was the miracle track. But then we had to decide whether to use it or not because The Distance was going to be a real rock album. I purposely didn't write any medium-tempo songs for this one because I wanted it to be hard rocking with a few ballads for pacing. But we figured we'd throw it on and see what happened. The next thing we know, the Capitol guys are saying, 'That's the single!' (laughs) Fine! Whatever it takes! So thank you, Rodney. It's a great song, and I'm beholden to the lad for writing it."

Personnel
Credits are adapted from the liner notes of Seger's 2003 Greatest Hits 2 compilation.

Bob Seger – lead vocals, harmony vocals

The Silver Bullet Band
Chris Campbell – bass
Craig Frost – organ

Additional musicians 
Drew Abbott – guitar
Laura Creamer – background vocals
Glenn Frey – harmony vocals
Bobbye Hall – percussion
Russ Kunkel – drums
Shaun Murphy – background vocals
Bill Payne – piano
Joan Sliwin – background vocals
Waddy Wachtel – guitar

Production
Jimmy Iovine – producer

Chart performance

Cover versions
Tanya Tucker also covered the song, for her 1983 album Changes.

Uses in pop culture
In 1989, the song was used in the season one episode of the TV series Midnight Caller entitled "The Fall.”

See also
List of number-one adult contemporary singles of 1983 (U.S.)

References

1982 singles
Rodney Crowell songs
Tanya Tucker songs
Bob Seger songs
Songs written by Rodney Crowell
Capitol Records singles
Song recordings produced by Jimmy Iovine
1981 songs